Blue Skies Again is a 1983 American comedy film directed by Richard Michaels and written by Kevin Sellers. The film stars Harry Hamlin, Mimi Rogers, Kenneth McMillan, Robyn Barto, Dana Elcar, and Joseph Gian. It is Andy García's feature film debut. The film was produced by Warner Bros. and was released on July 29, 1983.

Premise
A young female softball player Paula Fradkin (Robyn Barto) is obsessed with baseball.

Paula travels to Fort Lauderdale during Spring Training and tries to convince the Denver Devils' owner Sandy (Harry Hamlin) and manager Lou (Dana Elcar) to let her try out for the team. 

Her assault on the Major Leagues' gender barrier is finally made possible when team owner Sandy, a male-chauvinist and bachelor, is attracted to Fradkin's personal manager Liz (Mimi Rogers).

Paula performs well in training, but the fact that the new player at second base is female leads to resentment among both players and officials. Eventually coach Dirk (Kenneth McMillan) calls on Paula to bat in a game and she responds with a base hit.

Cast 
Harry Hamlin as Sandy Mendenhall
Mimi Rogers as Liz West
Kenneth McMillan as Dirk Miller
Robyn Barto as Paula Fradkin
Dana Elcar as Lou Goff
Joseph Gian as Calvin Berry
Doug Moeller as Carroll
Tommy Lane as The Boy
Andy Garcia as Ken
Marcos Gonzales as Chico "Brushback" Carrasco
Cylk Cozart as Alvin "Wallstreet" Chandler
Jerry Richardson as Dick Dent

References

External links 
 
 
 

1983 films
Warner Bros. films
American sports comedy films
1980s sports comedy films
1983 comedy films
Films directed by Richard Michaels
1980s English-language films
1980s American films